This is a list of provinces of Cuba by Human Development Index as of 2023 with data for the year 2021.

References 

Cuba

Cuba
Economy of Cuba